Arnas is a commune of the Rhône department, eastern France.

Neighboring municipalities 

 Villefranche-sur-Saône
 Gleizé
 Denicé
 Saint-Julien
 Saint-Georges-de-Reneins
 Fareins

Population

See also
Communes of the Rhône department

References

Communes of Rhône (department)
Beaujolais (province)